Crossconnell is a townland in the Urris Valley, located in the North-West corner of the Inishowen Peninsula. 

It is in the Electoral Division of Dunaff, in Civil Parish of Clonmany, in the Barony of Inishowen East, in County Donegal. It borders the following other townlands: Binnion to the east; Straid to the south; Tullagh to the West.  It contains the subtownland of Crocklacky.

It has an area of 115.14 hectares.  This is the equivalent of 284 acres, 2 roods and 4 perches.

History 
The townland is referenced in Griffith Valuation, a land valuation survey prepared in the 1850s. A total of 21 households are recorded.

On 28 May 1892, Crossconnell experienced heavy flooding after an unusually rainfall. The storm led to a heavy loss of crops and livestock.

Places of interest 

Crossconnell National School is a good example of a two classroom rural national school.  The school was built in 1928, using a standard plan adapted to local conditions.  The school was closed in the late 1960s with the decline in the rural population.

References 

Townlands of County Donegal